The Sapporo bid for the 2030 Winter Olympics is a proposed bid to bring the 2030 Winter Olympics to the city of Sapporo, Japan. Sapporo previously hosted the 1972 Winter Olympics, the first time that the Winter Olympics were held in Asia. They also hosted the FIS Nordic World Ski Championships 2007.

Details
Sapporo 2030 was the first official bid for the 2030 Winter Olympics.

Sapporo was initially considered to bid for the 2026 Winter Olympics, but was withdrawn on 17 September 2018.

Due to the cost overrun from the postponement of the 2020 Summer Olympics and facing a very likely situation of withdrawing the bid, a revised budget that was released which would lower the cost of the games to between 280 billion and 300 billion yen.

A recent report which was released before the start of the Beijing games showed that, due to climate change, by the end of the century, Sapporo might be the only city among the 21 cities to have hosted the Winter Olympics to be able to provide fair and safe conditions to host the Winter Olympics.

In March 2022, Sapporo's government released a draft plan for the games.

In December 2022, Sapporo officials said that that organizers would "discontinue for some time" while investigating the scandal relating to Tokyo 2020, but the bid would not be canceled.

Impact of Tokyo 2020 Bribery scandal 
A number of bribery and corruption allegations tied to the 2020 Tokyo Olympic and Paralympic Games have surfaced since mid-2022, which have been viewed as a potential setback for Japan in its bid to host the 2030 Games. Seiko Hashimoto, an Olympic bronze medalist, politician and former head of the Tokyo 2020 Organising Committee, said in December 2022 that the scandal seemed "very severe," adding that it was important to sort the issues out so that Sapporo can proceed with its 2030 Olympic bid efforts. Later that month, Hokkaido Governor Naomichi Suzuki admitted that it was "difficult to keep fostering momentum" for the 2030 Olympic bid due to the corruption allegations. Sapporo mayor Katsuhiro Akimoto announced on 20 December 2022 that his city would halt the aggressive promotion of its 2030 Olympic bid in order to "dispel the public's unease" about the scandals and reconsider their promotion tactics.

References 

2030 Winter Olympics
Sport in Sapporo
Japan at the Olympics
Olympic Games bids by Japan